Ermin Gadžo (born 19 May 1990) is a Bosnian footballer who last played for RWB Adria in the United Premier Soccer League.

Club career
Gadžo had a spell with Ålandish team IFK Mariehamn in the Finnish Veikkausliiga. He scored 6 goals for Zvijezda Gradačac in the 2014/15 Bosnian Premier League season, but the club was relegated to the second tier.

He played for American side RWB Adria in 2016 and 2017.

References 

1990 births
Living people
Footballers from Sarajevo
Association football forwards
Bosnia and Herzegovina footballers
Bosnia and Herzegovina youth international footballers
NK Čelik Zenica players
FK Velež Mostar players
IFK Mariehamn players
NK Zvijezda Gradačac players
Premier League of Bosnia and Herzegovina players
Veikkausliiga players
United Premier Soccer League players
Bosnia and Herzegovina expatriate footballers
Expatriate footballers in Finland
Bosnia and Herzegovina expatriate sportspeople in Finland
Expatriate soccer players in the United States
Bosnia and Herzegovina expatriate sportspeople in the United States